Public Opinion Quarterly is an academic journal published by Oxford University Press for the American Association for Public Opinion Research, covering communication studies and political science. It was established in 1937 and according to the Journal Citation Reports, the journal has a 2015 impact factor of 1.429, ranking it 20th out of 79 journals in the category "Communication", 37th out of 163 journals in the category "Political Science" and 18th out of 93 journals in the category "Social Sciences, Interdisciplinary". The journal was originally sponsored by Princeton University's Woodrow Wilson School of Public and International Affairs. Its first editor-in-chief was former diplomat DeWitt Clinton Poole.

See also 
 List of political science journals
 Lloyd A. Free

References

External links
 

Communication journals
Oxford University Press academic journals
Publications established in 1937
English-language journals
Quarterly journals
Political science journals